SCG International was founded in 1996 to provide government and private sectors with domestic and international security, logistics and training services.  After SCG and its former CEO Jamie Smith lost a $9.5 million lawsuit, the Virginian-Pilot reported that SCG was apparently defunct and that Jamie Smith had left the United States.  In August 2012, the US Air Force debarred the company for a period of three years from any federal assistance.

History

SCG International was established as the Delta Training Center (DTC) in 1996, and has operated as SCG International since 2002. Since its founding in 1996, SCG has been operated under the direction of experienced former United States government intelligence officers and military personnel. SCG personnel have worked with more than 1,200 clients (including nine Fortune 500 companies) in over 14 countries. SCG International provides training and security services to governments, law enforcement and military units, and to private and corporate entities. It was one of several private security firms employed following the U.S. invasion of Afghanistan.

SCG was one of over 60 private security firms employed during the Iraq War and the U.S. invasion of Afghanistan to guard officials and installations, train Iraq's and Afghanistan's new army and police, and provide other support for coalition forces.  Other executives within the firm came from US Army Special Forces, US Navy SEALs and the USMC. The company was bought out by a private party, closed its headquarters in 2012, moved all corporate operations to Abu Dhabi, and is engaged in anti-piracy, foreign military training operations, security and intelligence support contracts.

Jamie Smith

Jamie Smith founded SCG in 2002 and was ultimately fired from the company in 2010. Prior to 2002, he claimed to work at Blackwater Security Consulting as Vice President.

Smith claims to have a background as a CIA officer in publications for SCG, although this assertion has been challenged and never independently verified.

See also
Private military contractor
History of Afghanistan

References

External links
SCG International website
National Public Radio broadcast of Marketplace. Subject: Recruiting soldiers for private security work worldwide describing SCG's recruiting and hiring practices in Iraq and Afghanistan by Steve Henn (April 13, 2004)
Article describing the company's role in the Iraq and Afghanistan war
Robert Young Pelton's World: Traveling Right about SCG's training courses for those traveling to war zones

Private military contractors
Companies based in Virginia
Companies established in 1996